Events from the year 1757 in Denmark.

Incumbents
 Monarch – Frederick V
 Prime minister – Johan Ludvig Holstein-Ledreborg

Events

Undated

Births
 Johanna Elisabeth Dahlén, stage actress and opera singer

Deaths
 13 January – Bredo von Munthe af Morgenstierne, civil servant, Supreme Court justice and landowner (born 1701)
 4 April – Peder Hersleb, bishop (born 1689).
 31 July  – Abraham Lehn, landowner (born 1702)
 37 June – Christine Sophie Holstein, salonist (born 1672)
 3 September – Anna Catharina Materna, actress (born 1731)

References

 
1750s in Denmark
Denmark
Years of the 18th century in Denmark